Vosi (also Romanized as Vosī; also known as Vosī-ye Chūbar) is a village in Chubar Rural District, Haviq District, Talesh County, Gilan Province, Iran. At the 2006 census, its population was 107, in 23 families.

References 

Populated places in Talesh County